Häring or Haering is a German surname. Notable people with the surname include:

 Bernhard Häring (1912–1998), German theologian
 Hugo Häring (1882–1958), German architect
 Harold Haering (1930–2014), American politician
 Norbert Häring (born 1963), German journalist

See also
 Bad Häring, Austria
 Herink, Czech Republic
 Harring
 Haring
 Hering (disambiguation)

German-language surnames
Surnames from nicknames
de:Häring